Javaris Davis (born December 26, 1997) is an American football cornerback. He played college football for Auburn. He played for the Miami Dolphins of the National Football League (NFL) and Orlando Guardians of the XFL.

College career
Davis was a member of the Auburn Tigers he made freshman All Sec Team in 2016. He finished his college career with 150 tackles, 32 passes broken up, eight interceptions, and one forced fumble in 49 games played with 43 starts.

Professional career

Miami Dolphins
Davis was claimed off waivers by the Miami Dolphins on July 27, 2020. He was waived by the team on August 6, 2020. The Dolphins signed Davis to their practice squad on September 6, 2020. He signed a reserve/future contract with the Dolphins on January 5, 2021. Davis was waived by the Dolphins during final roster cuts on August 31, 2021, and re-signed to the practice squad the next day. Davis was elevated to the active roster on November 28, 2021, for the team's Week 12 game against the Carolina Panthers. He signed a reserve/future contract with the Dolphins on January 11, 2022. He was released on June 9, 2022.

Orlando Guardians
Davis was placed on the reserve list by the Orlando Guardians of the XFL on February 23, 2023. He was released on March 15.

References

External links
Auburn Tigers bio
Miami Dolphins bio

1996 births
Living people
Sportspeople from Jacksonville, Florida
American football cornerbacks
Auburn Tigers football players
Kansas City Chiefs players
Miami Dolphins players
Cincinnati Bengals players
Orlando Guardians players